Mary Pickford (1892–1979) was a Canadian-American motion picture actress.

Mary Pickford may also refer to:

 Mary Pickford (politician) (1884–1934), British politician
 Mary Pickford (physiologist) (1902–2002), British physiologist
 Mary Pickford (cocktail)
 "Mary Pickford (Used to Eat Roses)", song by Katie Melua

See also

 Mary (given name)
 Pickford (surname)
 
 Pickford (disambiguation)
 Mary (disambiguation)